Stadio Picchi, is a multi-purpose stadium in Jesolo, Italy.  It was mainly used mostly for football matches and hosted the home matches of U.S. Città di Jesolo in Serie D.  The stadium has a capacity of 4,000 spectators and meets Lega Pro criteria.

International friendlies

Historic Matches

On August 18, 1985, the stadium hosted the first match ever played by the United States women's national soccer team, who were defeated by a score of 1-0 by the Italy women's national football team.

References

External links
Soccerbook Profile
Comune Jesolo
Football Australia

Football venues in Italy
Multi-purpose stadiums in Italy